Nangal Dewat is a census town in the South West district of the Indian state of Delhi. Airport Authority of India (AAI) acquired the village in 1965 for future expansion, however, due to repeated protests, it was not fully acquired until 2007.

The settlement is made up of four blocks and has many parks and lands for future use. This is the first modern village in Delhi with broad roads and multi-story homes. Rental properties are a source of income for the villagers.

Demographics
 census, Nangal Dewat had a population of 13,168. Males constitute 56% of the population and females 44%. Nangal Dewat has an average literacy rate of 64%, which is higher than the national average of 59.5%. Male literacy is 73% and female literacy is 52%. In Nangal Dewat, 14% of the population is under 6 years of age.

This village was demolished in 2007 for the IGI airport extension. The inhabitants were moved to Vasant Kunj . AAI (Airport Authority of India) and DDA (Delhi Development Authority) are doing major malfunctioning to allot the alternative plots. Many villagers would not get alternative plots until August 2013, and most of the villagers do not live in the new Nangal Dewat as the plots are still not allotted to them. More than 58 families including children and elderly were on hunger strike since 12 December 2016 although they possess the proofs from the High Court and Lt. Governor's Order. People were waiting for justice as of 2017 however village were displaced on 2007 by AAI without paying even a single rupee. DDA has been accused of corruption in allotting plots by using a population survey from 1972. By 2007 the families in the 1972 survey had grown and the single plot leads to loss of valuable land. Plots were a maximum plot size of 650 meters square. The government displaced the entire village without paying for construction. DDA saved half of the land acquired for  villagers by using an old survey, however, villagers didn't receive half of their land share.

References

Cities and towns in South West Delhi district